Dresden-Strehlen is a railway station located in the district of  in Dresden. Opening in 1903, the station serves Dresden S-Bahn and DB Regio Südost trains along with public transport from Dresdner Verkehrsbetriebe (DVB).

History
Dresden-Strehlen railway station opened in 1903 to serve as a haltepunkt. The station's design was commissioned by Royal Saxon State Railways at a cost of 56,656 Marks. Architect and painter  completed a watercolor of the station in 1980. Today, the painting is a part of  collection located in Dresden. The station's building was bought by a consulting firm in 2017 and proceeded to refurbish the structure to house their IT professionals. The building also includes a restaurant, public transit facilities, and an event space.

As a part of the Stadtbahnprogrammn 2020 planned by DVB, the plan called for realignment of tram routes 9 and 13 to connect with railway services at Dresden-Strehlen. The plan was approved by Landesdirektion Sachsen in 2016. Construction on the project began in March 2017. The construction project overran its initial budget of 16.7 million euros to 24 million euros, a 44% increase. The realignment began operations in July 2019.

References

External links
Dresden-Strehlen | Deutsche Bahn AG - Official DB site (in English).

Strehlen
Railway stations in Germany opened in 1903
DresdenStrehlen